The Snake Brothers (literally Cobras and Grass Snakes) is a 2015 Czech crime drama film directed by Jan Prušinovský. The film is set in a small Czech town Kralupy nad Vltavou in central Bohemia, Czech Republic.

Cast
 Matěj Hádek as Vojtěch "Grass Snake" Šťastný
 Kryštof Hádek as Petr "Cobra" Šťastný
 Jan Hájek as Tomáš
 Lucie Žáčková as Zůza
 David Máj as Ládík
 Věra Kubánková as Grandma
 Jana Šulcová - as Mother
 Lucie Polišenská as Kača

Reception
The film has received generally positive reviews. It holds 74% at Kinobox, a Czech film review aggregator.

Awards
The Screenplay was awarded by Film foundation in 2011.

The film won Best Actor Award at 2015 Karlovy Vary International Film Festival for Kryštof Hádek. Kryštof noted that the award belongs to his brother Matěj too.

In March 2016 the film won the Czech Lion prize for best film. It also won in the categories of Best Director (Jan Prušinovský), Best Cinematography (Petr Koblovský), Best Actor (Matěj Hádek) and Best Actor and Actress in supporting roles (Kryštof Hádek and Lucie Žáčková). It also won two non-statutory prizes for Best Poster Award and the Prize of film fans. It did not win another 6 nominations (best screenplay, editing, sound, set design, costumes and masks).

References

2015 films
2010s Czech-language films
2015 crime drama films
Czech crime drama films
Czech Lion Awards winners (films)